The Woodlands is a special-purpose district and census-designated place (CDP) in the U.S. state of Texas in the Houston–The Woodlands–Sugar Land metropolitan statistical area. The Woodlands is primarily located in Montgomery County, with portions extending into Harris County. The Woodlands is governed by The Woodlands Township, an organization that provides municipal services and is administered by an elected board of directors. As of the 2020 U.S. Census, the township had a population of 114,436 people.  In 2021, The Howard Hughes Corporation estimated the population of The Woodlands was 119,000. The United States Census Bureau defines an urban area separate from the Houston urban area with The Woodlands as a principal city: The Woodlands–Conroe, TX urban area had a 2020 population of 402,454, making it the 103rd largest in the United States.

Though it began as an exurban development and a bedroom community, it has also attracted corporations and has several corporate campuses, most notably Occidental Petroleum Corporation,  Chevron Phillips Chemical, Huntsman Corporation, Woodforest National Bank, Baker Hughes, McKesson Specialty Health, and Halliburton. The community won a Special Award for Excellence in 1994 from the Urban Land Institute.

History

Early history
The area that is now The Woodlands was used by the Akokisa and Bidai peoples, who relied on the fresh water of Spring Creek. In 1984, construction in the Indian Springs neighborhood near the creek discovered Bidai artifacts.

Foundation and growth 
The Woodlands was conceived after the oil industry investor George P. Mitchell attended a symposium by the Rouse Company subsidiary American City Corporation and developer of Columbia, Maryland, on how to develop new towns using the HUD Title VII program. It was dedicated by George P. Mitchell in 1974 and managed by The Woodlands Corporation as an extension of Mitchell Energy & Development. Mitchell, an oil businessman, planned to establish a conference center, hotels, office parks, retail malls, schools, large distribution centers, and golf courses. Houses would range from moderately priced to expensive and large. Bill Schadewald of the Houston Business Journal said that Mitchell wanted the development to "entice city slickers looking for far-flung suburban quality of life". Schadewald said that local sources stated that the HUD New Town program, a federally funded program, had a "low survival rate" and questioned whether The Woodlands would succeed.

The Woodlands Corporation was acquired on July 31, 1997, by a partnership between Morgan Stanley and Crescent Real Estate Equities. In December 2003, Rouse Company acquired Crescent's interest, and Rouse was bought by General Growth Properties on November 12, 2004. In 2011, The Woodlands was sold to the Howard Hughes Development Corporation.

The land was previously occupied by the Grogan-Cochran Lumber Mill, hence Grogan's Mill and Cochran's Crossing neighborhoods, called "villages". The original planning utilized many of the planning concepts and design consultants employed in other well-regarded new communities of that era such as Columbia, Maryland, Irvine Ranch, California, and Reston, Virginia. The original development plan included environmental design principles espoused by Ian McHarg, a distinguished landscape architect, teacher and author of the seminal work Design With Nature.

In 2012, the U.S. Census Bureau designated the area around The Woodlands and Conroe as a "large urbanized transit area", defined as having over 200,000 residents, making it eligible to receive federal transportation funds.

Incorporation as a city
Mitchell's original plan was for The Woodlands to be annexed by the city of Houston. In the middle part of the 2000s, some residents feared such an annexation, as had happened to the Kingwood development almost a decade before. To counteract any possible move by the city, a movement began to create an independent city government. However, the formation of an independent government would require authorization by the State of Texas and the City of Houston, as Houston held extraterritorial jurisdiction over the area.

In 2007, two state legislators representing The Woodlands, Sen. Tommy Williams and Rep. Robert Eissler, introduced two bills that were enacted in the 2007 Legislature – House Bill 4109 and Senate Bill 1012. HB 4109 called for a vote to allow expansion of an existing improvement district (now The Woodlands Township) and to allow The Woodlands to collect sales tax, while SB 1012 allowed for the creation of regional agreements between governments. The passage of these bills allows an opportunity for The Woodlands to incorporate itself until 2057. Since 2019, there has been formal discussion of The Woodlands to become an incorporated city. However, as a result of the ongoing COVID-19 pandemic, these plans were put on hold and resumed in April 2021. In 2020, residents of The Woodlands formed the TownshipFuture PAC. In a referendum on November 2, 2021, residents voted against incorporation by a wide margin, keeping The Woodlands as a township for the foreseeable future.

Geography

The Woodlands is primarily in Montgomery County, Texas, with a small portion in Harris County, bordering Houston.

The Woodlands is in a heavily forested area, and much of the community has retained trees for shade and decoration. The terrain is essentially flat, with the exception of topographic variations ranging from 125 to 175 feet above sea level between Spring Creek and Flintridge Drive.

Villages 
The Woodlands is organized into eight villages, which are subdivided into neighborhoods. Each village features varying amenities including parks, hike and bike trails, golfing, commercial centers, and a range of residential properties from single family to estates.
The Town Center includes shopping and eating facilities, corporate offices, and a waterway modeled after the San Antonio River Walk. The Research Forest district includes a Park and Ride facility and The Woodlands Township Town Hall.

 Alden Bridge
 Cochran's Crossing
 College Park
 Creekside Park
 Grogan's Mill
 Indian Springs
 Panther Creek
 Sterling Ridge

Climate
The Woodlands has a humid subtropical climate, typical to the Southeast Texas region and Greater Houston. Temperature ranges are within the top decile for census-designated places in the United States. Winter daily highs average approximately 60 degrees Fahrenheit (15C), daily lows 40 degrees Fahrenheit (4C); summer daily highs average 94 degrees Fahrenheit (34C), daily lows 72 (22C) degrees Fahrenheit. It is part of Wind Zone 2 per the FEMA mapping chart.

Protected Areas
The Woodlands has 151 urban parks within its boundaries, with all residents being within a ten-minute walk of a park.

The areas surrounding Spring Creek are protected as part of the George Mitchell Nature Preserve, a section of the larger Spring Creek Greenway, the "longest, connected, urban forested corridor in the nation."

The northern part of the CDP borders on the W. Goodrich Jones State Forest. This forest, managed by the Texas A&M Forest Service, serves as a vital habitat for the endangered red-cockaded woodpecker.

Demographics

At the 2010 U.S. census, there were 93,847 people living in The Woodlands. In 2021, its population was estimated at 119,000 per a survey by The Howard Hughes Corporation. According to the 2020 United States census, there were 114,436 people, 41,210 households, and 31,063 families residing in the CDP.

The racial makeup of The Woodlands in 2020 was 77.3% white (non-Hispanic and Hispanic or Latino), 4.2% Black or African American, 0.1% American Indian and Alaska Native, 6.7% Asian, 0.1% Native Hawaiian and Other Pacific Islander, 9.1% two or more races, 17.9% Hispanic or Latino, and 67.9% white alone, not Hispanic or Latino.

 about 10% of the residents of The Woodlands were of Mexican origins; they numbered at over 10,000. In 2000, wealthy Mexicans began buying houses in The Woodlands for vacation purposes. Large numbers settled in The Woodlands from 2006 to 2014 as the Mexican Drug War occurred. By 2006 the numbers of middle and upper class Hispanics and Latinos, including Mexican nationals, increased. Some of the residents were assigned to Houston by their companies. Some of them moved to The Woodlands to escape increased crime and political tensions from the Mexican presidential election and find better schools for their children.

At the 2013–2014 school year, 22% of the students at Conroe Independent School District elementary and junior high schools in The Woodlands were Hispanic or Latin American. This was an increase from 10.5% in the 2005–2006 school year, and the percentages grew particularly in Glen Loch, Lamar, and Tough elementary schools. The 2013-2014 percentage in Conroe ISD schools in The Woodlands was below the overall Conroe ISD Hispanic average of 34.2%.

The Hispanic and Latin American community has Viva! The Woodlands Magazine, a Spanish language magazine that covers The Woodlands, as well as the Montgomery County Hispanic Chamber of Commerce. Many churches in The Woodlands area have some services in Spanish.

In 2000, there were 55,649 people, 19,881 households, and 15,546 families. The population density was 2,328.4 people per square mile (900.5/km2).There were 21,014 housing units at an average density of 897.7 per square mile (346.6/km2). The racial makeup was 92.36% White, 1.75% Black, 0.29% Native American, 2.80% Asian, 0.05% Pacific Islander, 1.43% from other races, and 1.32% from two or more races. Hispanic or Latino of any race were 28% of the population.

There were 19,881 households, out of which 47.1% had children under the age of 18 living with them, 69.2% were married couples living together, 7.2% had a female householder with no husband present, and 21.8% were non-families. 19.1% of all households were made up of individuals, and 7.3% had someone living alone who was 65 years of age or older. The average household size was 2.78 and the average family size was 3.21. At the 2000 U.S. census, 31.8% were under the age of 18, 5.0% from 18 to 24, 30.5% from 25 to 44, 25.1% from 45 to 64, and 7.6% were 65 years of age or older. The median age was 37 years. For every 100 females, there were 92.9 males; for every 100 females age 18 and over there were 88.5 males.

The median income for a household according to the 2020 census was $130,011. The per capita income is $67,290. About 3.9% of the population were below the poverty line. 
97.8% of residents 25 years or older are high school graduates or higher. 64.3% of residents 25 years or older have a bachelor’s degree or higher.
</ref>

Religion 

As of 2011, the community is majority Christian.

, The Woodlands United Methodist Church had about 13,000 members in its congregation. It was established in 1978. Pastor Kerry Shook established Fellowship of The Woodlands Church, now known as Woodlands Church, in 1993. Its permanent church building opened on August 19, 2001. Church Project, which holds services in a former Kroger, had an average weekly attendance of 1,500 in 2014.  Christ Church United Methodist has about 3,000 members. Circa 2012 Covenant United Methodist Church began its worship services at Timber Creek Elementary School, and by 2016 bought  of land near the entrance of Village of Creekside Park for a permanent 700-seat facility. On December 25, 2001, the Korean Community Church in The Woodlands, with Presbyterian Korean-language services and non-denominational English services, opened. It opened to serve ethnic Koreans in The Woodlands, Conroe, Huntsville, Kingwood, and Spring. Other Protestant or non-denominational Christian churches in The Woodlands include Lord of Life Lutheran Church, Trinity Episcopal Church, and Unity of The Woodlands.

Saints Simon and Jude Catholic Parish, the first Catholic church in The Woodlands, was established circa 1980, with its 400 parishioners initially meeting at Knox Junior High School before moving into its permanent building in 1981.  it had 3,800 families in its congregation. St. Anthony of Padua, another Catholic church, had 3,020 families in its congregation in 2006, and 5,700 families in its congregation in 2013. It operates St. Anthony of Padua Catholic School.

There are two Jewish places of worship, traditional and reformed. Congregation Beth Shalom, established circa 1984 led by Rabbi Edwin C. Goldberg, has about 175 families, and is affiliated with Reform Judaism. Its affiliated organizations are the Association of Reformed Congregations and the Union of American Hebrew Congregations. Chabad of The Woodlands was established in 2011 by Rabbi Mendel and Leah Blecher. It is a branch of the worldwide Chabad Lubavitch movement, offering traditional-style services to contemporary Jewish families. Chabad of The Woodlands inaugurated and sponsors the annual Hanukkah on Market Street celebration, and established the first Jewish preschool in the area.

In 2011, there were 350 Hindu families in The Woodlands. In a 15-year period ending in 2011, the Hindu population in the Woodlands increased by 300%, and Kate Shellnut of the Houston Chronicle stated that according to "Hindu leaders" every year the Hindu population in The Woodlands grows by 20 to 25 families. The Hindu Temple of The Woodlands, a Hindu temple serving the northern part of Greater Houston, was scheduled to open in 2010. Another Hindu temple, Char Dham Hindu Temple, was founded by Surya Sahoo.

Masjid al-Ansaar (Woodlands Islamic Center) of the Islamic Society of Greater Houston (ISGH) was created in 2009, and in 2019 it had 300 parishioners. It is in an unincorporated area outside of The Woodlands.

Ethnic groups 

 about 10% of the residents of The Woodlands were of Mexican origins; they numbered at over 10,000. In 2000 wealthy Mexicans began buying houses in The Woodlands for vacation purposes. Large numbers settled in The Woodlands from 2006 to 2014 as the Mexican Drug War occurred. In 2017 many wealthy Mexicans in Texas were moving back to Mexico and fewer were moving to The Woodlands. The Rice University Baker Institute director, Tony Payán, stated that uncertainty regarding the Trump Administration's attitudes towards immigration and the decline in value of the Mexican peso were factors.

Economy

By 2000, a significant amount of corporate office space was under construction.

As of 2000, the Anadarko building was the largest office project in The Woodlands.
In January 2012, Anadarko announced the imminent construction of a sister tower on site, 31 stories high, of which ten will be for parking. According to a press release from the company, site work had already begun and construction of the tower would be complete by 2014. The building is at the corner of Woodloch Forest Dr and Lake Robbins Dr. With its completed sister tower, Hackett Tower is the tallest building in Montgomery County and between Houston and Dallas.Chicago Bridge & Iron's (CB&I) worldwide administrative office was in The Woodlands. In 2018 McDermott International, which acquired CB&I, announced that it would sell the headquarters facility in The Woodlands to Howard Hughes Corporation.

In 2000, work began on a  building for Maersk Sealand.

In 2011, ExxonMobil announced plans to construct a new complex on a 385-acre plot of land near the intersection of the Hardy Toll Road and Interstate 45, which is in the Houston ETJ and might be annexed by Houston. About 10,000 employees in the Houston area will relocate to the campus starting in 2014, with full occupancy by 2015.

Other companies based in The Woodlands include Woodforest National Bank, Lexicon Pharmaceuticals, McKesson Corporation, Tetra Technologies, Rigaku, Cleaning Solutions, Huntsman Corporation, and Kroger Texas.

Many wealthy Mexicans who settled in The Woodlands due to rising crime in Mexico had also established businesses in The Woodlands.

Arts and culture

Cultural events include:
 The Cynthia Woods Mitchell Pavilion, the summer location of the Houston Symphony.
 The Woodlands Waterway, which stretches from The Woodlands Mall to Lake Woodlands, and has lighted sidewalks.
 Market Street, a shopping district with a movie theater, shops and restaurants.
 The Woodlands Mall, which borders the waterway and is adjacent to Market Street, forming a large shopping district.
 Every April, The Woodlands Waterway Arts Festival draws 220 international juried artists.
The Woodlands Concert Band, established in 2001, performs at local events, and is composed of amateur and profession musicians.

Each village in The Woodlands has its own shopping center.

Government
The Woodlands Township is a special-purpose district created by the 73rd Texas Legislature in 1993, and is run by a seven-member board of directors who are elected directly by the residents of the township in an at large election, for two year staggered terms. Even though The Woodlands is not a city nor a traditional township government, it still provides limited municipal government services such as trash pickup, parks and recreation, covenant enforcement, fire and rescue services, streetscaping, economic development, and enhanced law enforcement and security patrols.

Education
Most students in the Montgomery County portion attend schools in the Conroe Independent School District. Children residing in the May Valley neighborhood in Sterling Ridge Village attend schools in the Magnolia Independent School District. Children from the Creekside Park Village in Harris County attend the Tomball Independent School District.

Montgomery County Memorial Library System operates two libraries in The Woodlands, the South Branch and the George and Cynthia Woods Mitchell Library. Most schools have the honored rank of an exemplary school, the highest school ranking in Texas. Texas students are administered the STAAR test, a review of general knowledge, which can determine students' promotion to the next grade level.

Primary and secondary schools

Public schools
The Woodlands High School (TWHS) serves the western portion of The Woodlands in Montgomery County. TWHS was ranked 626 on Newsweek's 2012 list of America's Best High Schools.

The Woodlands College Park High School, which opened in 2005, serves the eastern portion of The Woodlands in Montgomery County. TWCP was ranked 382 on Newsweek's 2012 list of America's Best High Schools. College Park is also home to the Conroe ISD Academy of Science and Technology, a science and technology based magnet program. Refer to the Conroe School District for specific feeders. Magnolia High School serves pupils residing in May Valley, and Tomball High School serves pupils residing inside the Harris County portion.

Junior high schools
Montgomery County: Knox Junior High School, McCullough Junior High School
Harris County:  Creekside Park Junior High School

Private schools
By 2015, many private preparatory schools began campus expansions as The Woodlands had an increase in population and corporate office relocations.
The John Cooper School
The Woodlands Preparatory School
The Woodlands Christian Academy
St. Anthony of Padua Catholic School (K-8) (of the Roman Catholic Archdiocese of Galveston-Houston)

The closest Catholic high school is Frassati Catholic High School in north Harris County; the planners of the school intended for it to serve The Woodlands.

, the British International School of Houston in Greater Katy has a school bus service to The Woodlands.

Colleges and universities
Lone Star College (originally the North Harris Montgomery Community College District) and Sam Houston State University-The Woodlands Center serve the community. The territory in Conroe ISD joined the community college district in 1991, and the territory in Tomball ISD had joined the district in 1982. The headquarters of the Lone Star College System are located in The Woodlands and in unincorporated Montgomery County, Texas. The district moved to its current location on March 17, 2003. Our Lady of the Lake University, a private non-profit university based in San Antonio, moved its Houston Campus to The Woodlands in 2011.

Media
In 2007, The Bracelet of Bordeaux was filmed in The Woodlands. The cast and crew were largely composed of local residents, and the film was part of a larger effort to generate interest in using The Woodlands and Houston as shooting locations for major motion pictures.

Infrastructure
Law enforcement in Montgomery County is provided by the Montgomery County Sheriff's Office and the Texas Highway Patrol. The Harris County portion is covered by Harris County Constable Precinct #4.

The Brazos Transit District runs two transit services in The Woodlands: The Woodlands Express, which provides commuter service to Houston from park and ride lots in The Woodlands, and the free daily Waterway Trolley.

Notable people

Notes

References

External links
 The Woodlands Township, local government website

 
Planned cities in the United States
Census-designated places in Montgomery County, Texas
Census-designated places in Harris County, Texas
Census-designated places in Texas
Greater Houston
1974 establishments in Texas
Populated places established in 1974